State Route 105 (SR 105) is a  east–west state highway in West Tennessee. It traverses mainly rural areas and farmland.

Route description

Obion and Dyer counties

SR 105 begins on the Obion-Dyer county line at an interchange with US 51/SR 3 (Future I-69). It goes east to enter Dyer County and Trimble to have an intersection with SR 211. It then passes through town to have an intersection with SR 89 before turning south, where the highway then leaves Trimble and winds its way southeast through farmland to cross into Gibson County.

Gibson County

SR 105 turns east and heads toward Rutherford, where it has an interchange with US 45W/SR 5. It then passes through downtown, where it runs along Trenton Street, the former route of US 45W. The highway then leaves Rutherford and continues east to cross the Rutherford Fork of the Obion River and have an intersection with SR 445. SR 105 then turns southeast and begins to run parallel South Fork of the Obion River as it enters Bradford, where it has an intersection with US 45E/SR 43 and a concurrency with SR 54 through downtown. The highway then leaves Bradford and winds its way southeast to cross into Carroll County.

Carroll County

SR 105 then enters Trezevant and has intersections with SR 190 and US 79/SR 76. The highway then leaves Trezevant and continues southeast to enter McLemoresville and comes to an end at an intersection with US 70A/SR 77.

Other information

The entire route of SR 105 is a rural two-lane highway.

Major intersections

References

105
Transportation in Dyer County, Tennessee
Transportation in Gibson County, Tennessee
Transportation in Carroll County, Tennessee